Fountain Inn is a city in Greenville and Laurens counties in the U.S. state of South Carolina. The population was 10,416 at the 2020 census, up from 7,799 in 2010. It is part of the Greenville–Mauldin–Easley Metropolitan Statistical Area.

History
The Cannon Building, Fairview Presbyterian Church, Fountain Inn High School, Fountain Inn Principal's House and Teacherage, McDowell House, Robert Quillen Office and Library, Tullyton, and F. W. Welborn House are listed on the National Register of Historic Places.

Geography
The southern part of the city is in Laurens County, while the bulk of the city is in Greenville County. The city's nickname is "The Diamond Tip of the Golden Strip". The city took its name from an inn and fountain that were along the old stagecoach route. The stagecoach drivers called the stop "Fountain Inn", and it stuck. A small garden fountain is installed at City Hall, and there is a marker on the north side of town showing the former location of the old inn.

South Carolina Highway 14 runs through the center of town as Main Street, and Interstate 385 runs along the southern edge of the city, with access from Exits 22, 23, and 26.

There are several festivals in Fountain Inn, including Aunt Het Day, based on syndicated cartoon columnist Robert Quillen, that brings in several hundred visitors as Main Street is closed and filled with many unique vendors.

Demographics

2020 census

As of the 2020 United States census, there were 10,416 people, 3,170 households, and 2,532 families residing in the city.

2020 census
As of the census of 2020, there were 10,416 people.  The population density was 988.9 people per square mile (421.6/km2). There were 2,465 housing units at an average density of 447.2 per square mile (172.7/km2). The racial makeup of the city was 61.49% White, 27.9% African American, 1.6% Native American, 0.2% Asian, 0.00% Pacific Islander, and 7.4% from two or more races. Hispanic or Latino of any race were 8.7
% of the population.

There were 3,538 households.

The population in the city consists of 25.7% under 18 and 9.7% who were 65 years of age or older. The median age was 33 years. 

The median income for a family was $65,221. The per capita income for the city was $25,855. About 13.2% of the population were below the poverty line.

Government
Fountain Inn is governed by a mayor, a city council, a city administrator, and several boards and commissions. The current officeholders are:

City council

 Mayor: GP McLeer
 Council Ward I: Jason Sanders
 Council Ward II: Jay Thomasson
 Council Ward III: Joey Garrett
 Council Ward IV: Phil Clemmer
 Council Ward V: John Don
 Council Ward VI: Mack Blackstone

Crime
The city of Fountain Inn has one of the lowest crime rates in Greenville County and has the best record in closing case files of towns of similar sizes and geographic area. The Fountain Inn Police Department has annual reports and information regarding current records and statistical surveys of the area.

Education 
88.9% of the residents have a high school diploma or equivalent, 28.1% with bachelor's degree, and 4.1% hold a master's, professional or doctorate.

Notable people
Fountain Inn was the adopted home of journalist and humorist Robert Quillen, one of the "leading purveyors of village nostalgia" during the early decades of the 20th century.

Fountain Inn was the home town of one-legged tap dancer Clayton "Peg Leg" Bates.

Fountain Inn is the home town of Travelle Wharton, a retired NFL offensive lineman. He played for the Carolina Panthers of the NFL from 2004 through 2011. He joined the Cincinnati Bengals for the 2012 season. He played college football at the University of South Carolina.

See also
Fountain Inn High School

References

External links

 City of Fountain Inn official website

Cities in South Carolina
Cities in Greenville County, South Carolina
Cities in Laurens County, South Carolina
Upstate South Carolina